is a Japanese manga series about Japanese calligraphy, written and illustrated by Katsutoshi Kawai. It was serialized in Shogakukan's seinen manga magazine Weekly Young Sunday from December 2006 to July 2008, when the magazine ceased its publication, and it was then transferred to Big Comic Spirits where it ran from September 2008 to March 2015; its chapters were collected in 14 tankōbon volumes. A 6-episode television drama adaptation was broadcast on NHK from January to February 2010.

Characters

Media

Manga
Written and illustrated by Katsutoshi Kawai, Tomehane! Suzuri Kōkō Shodōbu was serialized in Shogakukan's seinen manga magazine Weekly Young Sunday from December 14, 2006, to July 14, 2008, when the magazine ceased its publication. The series was then transferred to Weekly Big Comic Spirits, where it ran from September 6, 2008, to March 16, 2015. Shogakukan collected its chapters in fourteen tankōbon volumes, released from May 2, 2007, to May 29, 2015.

Volume list

Drama
In June 2009, it was announced that the series would receive television drama adaptation. It was broadcast for six episodes on NHK from January 7 to February 11, 2010.

Reception
Tomehane! Suzuri Kōkō Shodōbu was nominated for the first two Manga Taisho in 2008 and 2009. It was one of the Jury Recommended Works at the 14th Japan Media Arts Festival in 2010.

Notes

References

External links
 Official website for the TV drama 
 

Comedy anime and manga
Japanese television dramas based on manga
NHK original programming
Seinen manga
Shogakukan manga